Ball of Nations (German: Ball der Nationen) is a 1954 West German musical comedy film directed by Karl Ritter and starring Zsa Zsa Gabor, Gustav Fröhlich and Claudine Dupuis. It was shot at the Wiesbaden Studios in Hesse and on location around the town. The film's sets were designed by the art directors Alfred Bütow and Ernst Schomer. It was not a success at the box office and was director Ritter's last film, after a plan to remake Pandora's Box fell through and he retired to Argentina.

Synopsis
American journalist is sent to cover a European peace conference but finds himself distracted by the attractive revue singer Vera van Loon.

Cast
 Zsa Zsa Gabor as Vera van Loon
 Gustav Fröhlich as Percy Buck
 Claudine Dupuis as 	Marianne
 Ingrid Lutz as Rosita
 Walter Müller as 	Michel
 Rolf Wanka as Brambachen
 Paul Henckels as 	Hopkins
 Alexander Golling as 	Scrjabin
 Erika von Thellmann as Baronin Ziegler
 Chris Howland as 	Dr. Johnson
 Ursula Herking as 	Stasi
 Lys Assia as 	Singer
 Herbert Kiper as 	Manager Oskar Kaiser
 Alice Treff as 	Madame Tschang
 Fred Nolt as 	Hoppe
 Herbert Schimkat as 	Prof. Heiborg
 Karina Dakar as 	Solotänzerin
 Ciro di Pardo as 	Solotänzer

References

Bibliography
 Bock, Hans-Michael & Bergfelder, Tim. The Concise CineGraph. Encyclopedia of German Cinema. Berghahn Books, 2009.

External links 
 

1954 films
1954 comedy films
German comedy films
West German films
1950s German-language films
Films directed by Karl Ritter
1950s German films
Operetta films
Films based on operettas

de:Ball der Nationen (Film)